is a Japanese actor best known for his roles in v-cinema yakuza movies.

Takeuchi has starred in many yakuza films and action films, such as Dead or Alive by Takashi Miike. Takeuchi also starred in Battle Royale II: Requiem, in which he played a fictionalized version of himself.

Takeuchi had also a short stint at the end of the professional wrestling promotion HUSTLE in 2009, posing as a villainous character based on himself called "King RIKI". The same year, Takeuchi recorded with Avex Group a version of Morning Musume's "Love Machine" for the song's tenth anniversary, appearing under his RIKI persona along with wrestlers Riki Choshu and Yoshihiro Takayama.

Selected filmography

Films
 The King Of Minami (1992-2009) as Ginjirô Manda 
 Tokyo Mafia: Yakuza Wars (1995) as Ginya Yabuki 
 Tokyo Mafia: Wrath of the Yakuza (1995) as Ginya Yabuki
 Peanuts (1996)
 Fudoh: The New Generation (1996) as Daigen Nohma
 Tokyo Mafia: Battle For Shinjuku (1996) as Ginya Yabuki
 Tokyo Mafia: Yakuza Blood (1997) as Ginya Yabuki
 Blood (1998)
 The Yakuza Way (1998) as Kanuma
 Dead or Alive (1999) as Ryuuichi
 Nobody as Nanbu (1999)
 Dead or Alive 2: Birds (2000) as Shuuichi Sawada
 Dead or Alive: Final (2002) as Officer Takeshi Honda
 Deadly Outlaw: Rekka (2002) as Kunisada
 Mafia Family Yanagawa (2002)
 Mafia Family Yanagawa 2 (2002)
 Battle Royale II: Requiem (2003) as himself 
 Last Life in the Universe (2003) as Takashi 
 Yakuza Demon (2003) as Seiji 
 Arashi no Yoru Ni (2005) as the voice of Giro
 Yo-Yo Girl Cop (2006) as Kazutoshi Kira
 Elite Yankee Saburo (2009) as Tokujirō Kunō
 Thermae Romae (2012) - Tateno
 Thermae Romae II (2014) - Tateno
 Tokyo Tribe (2014) as Buppa
 Real Girl (2018)
 My Father's Tracks (2021)

Television
 Kuroshoin no Rokubei (2018) as Saigō Takamori

Video games
 Yakuza 0 (2015) as Hiroki Awano
 Ryū ga Gotoku Ishin! (2023) as Takeda Kanryusai

Japanese dub
 Mad Max: Fury Road'' (2015) as Immortan Joe (Hugh Keays-Byrne)

References

External links 
 
 Official Website in Japanese
 https://web.archive.org/web/20060508105800/http://www.pulp-mag.com/archives/5.07/feature_takeuchi.shtml

1964 births
Living people
Japanese male actors
Japanese male singers
People from Ōita Prefecture
Musicians from Ōita Prefecture